Jane B. Reece (born 15 April 1944) is an American scientist and textbook author. Along with American biologist Neil Campbell, she wrote the widely used Campbell/Reece Biology textbooks.

Reece received an A.B. in Biology from Harvard University, an M.S. in microbiology from Rutgers University, and a Ph.D. in bacteriology from the University of California, Berkeley. Her doctoral thesis was entitled 'The RecE pathway of genetic combination in Escherichia Coli'. Having completed her Ph.D., she stayed at UC Berkeley for a while as a postdoctoral researcher, before accepting tenure at Stanford University as a researcher. Her research mainly focused on genetic recombination in bacteria.

Reece has taught at various colleges, including Middlesex County College (New Jersey) and Queensborough Community College (New York City). She is the author or co-author of several textbooks at Benjamin Cummings, at which place she has served as an editor since she joined in 1978.
Notable among her works is The World of the Cell, third edition, which she co-authored with W.M. Becker and M.F. Poesie.

In 2017 she was awarded an honorary doctorate from Uppsala University, Sweden.

References 

1944 births
Living people
American geneticists
American science writers
American textbook writers
Women textbook writers
Science teachers
Harvard University alumni
Rutgers University alumni
University of California, Berkeley alumni
Queensborough Community College faculty